Mayani Bird Conservation Reserve is located in Vaduj Forest Range of Satara Forest Division of Satara district.  It came into existence with the notification WLP1220/CR-246/F-1 dated 15th March, 2021. It is about 71 km from Satara.

Area
Mayani Conservation Reserve is of 866.75 hectares (8.67 sq.km.) and it is spread over 6 villages of Vaduj taluka namely Mayani, Kankatre, Ambavade, Nadval, Yeralwadi, Banpuri.

Mayani Dam (Talav)
The Mayani bird sanctuary is established on an old dam. 

Birds like the northern shoveller, stork and kingfisher can be found at the sanctuary.
Other resident and migratory bird species in the winter season include: coot, brahminy duck, black ibis, painted stork, common spoonbill, etc. 

Mayani Bird Sanctuary is studied as a typical wetland ecosystem which is rich in flora and fauna.

References

Bird sanctuaries of Maharashtra
Wildlife sanctuaries in Maharashtra
Protected areas with year of establishment missing